Tonadico (Tonadìch in local dialect) was a comune (municipality) in Trentino in the northern Italian region Trentino-Alto Adige/Südtirol, located about  east of Trento. It was merged with Siror, Fiera di Primiero and Transacqua on January 1, 2016, to form a new municipality, Primiero San Martino di Castrozza.

The municipality of Tonadico contains the frazioni (subdivisions) Tressane and part of San Martino di Castrozza.

Tonadico borders the following municipalities: Falcade, Moena, Canale d'Agordo, Taibon Agordino, Predazzo, Siror, Voltago Agordino, Gosaldo, Sagron Mis, Transacqua and Fiera di Primiero.

Demographic evolution

References

Cities and towns in Trentino-Alto Adige/Südtirol